Dharmesh Yelande (born 31 October 1983), popularly known as D-sir, is an Indian dancer, choreographer, actor and television personality.

Career
Yelande participated in Dance India Dance (2009–2010), Dance India Dance Li'l Masters (2010) and Dance Ke Superstars (2011) that aired on Zee TV. He was hired by Farah Khan to choreograph the movie Tees Maar Khan (2010).

In 2013, he debuted as an actor by playing a lead role in the 3D dance-based Indian film ABCD: Any Body Can Dance co-starring Salman Yusuff Khan and Prabhu Deva. In 2015, he acted in Disney's, ABCD 2 with Varun Dhawan and Shraddha Kapoor. He has a dance academy in Vadodara known as the D'virus Dance Academy.

In 2016, he has worked in the film Banjo opposite Riteish Deshmukh and Nargis Fakhri. He was a mentor for the dance reality show Dance Plus (2015–2019) for five consecutive seasons.

In 2020, he appeared in dance film Street Dancer 3D with Varun Dhawan, Shraddha Kapoor, Nora Fatehi and Raghav Juyal. Later he participated in Fear Factor: Khatron Ke Khiladi 10 (2020) and emerged as the second runner-up.

In 2021, he was a judge in Dance Deewane season 3.

Television

Filmography

As a choreographer

References

External links 

 
 
 

Indian choreographers
Indian male dancers
Place of birth missing (living people)
Living people
Dancers from Gujarat
Hip hop dancers
Fear Factor: Khatron Ke Khiladi participants
Reality dancing competition contestants
Participants in Indian reality television series
1983 births